The Stock Exchange Building is a building originally erected for the Stockholm Stock Exchange between 1773 and 1778 from construction drawings by Erik Palmstedt. The stock exchange moved out of the building completely in 1998. It is located on the north side of the square Stortorget in Gamla stan, the old town in central Stockholm, Sweden, and owned by the city council. Since 1914 it has been the home of the Swedish Academy, which uses the building for its meetings, such as those at which it selects and announces the name of the recipient of the Nobel Prize for Literature. The building also houses the Nobel Museum and the Nobel Library.

See also
 History of Stockholm

References

Further reading 

 

Commercial buildings completed in 1778
Buildings and structures in Stockholm
Building
Swedish Academy
Office buildings completed in 1778
Stock exchange buildings
Palaces in Sweden
Office buildings in Sweden